St Thomas of Canterbury Church of England Aided Junior School is a primary school located in Brentwood, Essex in England.

History
The school was founded in 1835 (although some argue that it was founded as a Penny School in 1715 and there are records of such a school in Brentwood). The school is now sited in Sawyers Hall Lane, Brentwood. The school moved to Sawyers Hall Lane in 1967 and was opened by the Duchess of Kent - Princess Margaret- in 1968. The 40th Anniversary was celebrated in 2008.

Walking bus
The school has the largest walking bus in Essex.

References

*
*

External links
 Official Junior School Website
 St Thomas' Church Website
 St Thomas of Canterbury Infant School Website

Schools in Brentwood (Essex town)
1835 establishments in England
Primary schools in Essex
Church of England primary schools in the Diocese of Chelmsford
Educational institutions established in 1835
Voluntary aided schools in England